Paul Andrew Readman, FRHistS, is a political and cultural historian. He is Professor in Modern British History at King's College London, where he was Head of the History Department (2008–12) and as of 2018 is Vice-Dean for Research.

Biography 
Paul Readman was educated at Newpark Comprehensive School in County Dublin, Ireland, before attending Christ's College, Cambridge, where he received Bachelor of Arts (BA), Master of Philosophy (MPhil) and Doctor of Philosophy (DPhil) degrees; his doctorate was awarded in 2002 for his thesis entitled "The role of land and landscape in English cultural and political debate, c. 1880–1910". From 1999 to 2002, Readman was a Research Fellow at Christ's College, Cambridge. In 2002, he became a lecturer at King's College London, and as of 2018 is now Professor in Modern British History. From 2008 to 2012, he was Head of the university's History Department, and is also Vice-Dean for Research. As of 2018, he is a Fellow of the Royal Historical Society.

Research 
Readman's research focuses on the cultural and political history of modern Britain; he specialises in British electoral politics from the 1860s to the 1940s, the history of British landscape preservation, the 'Land Question' in British politics, and patriotism and national identities in Britain. His published works include:
 (edited with Arthur Burns and Chad Bryant) Walking Histories 1800–1914 (Basingstoke: Palgrave Macmillan, 2016).
 "William Cecil Slingsby, Norway, and British Mountaineering 1872–1914", The English Historical Review, vol. 129, no. 540 (2014), pp. 1098–1128.
 (edited with Cynthia Radding and Chad Bryant) Borderlands in World History, 1700–1914 (Basingstoke: Palgrave Macmillan, 2014).
 (edited with Thomas Otte) By-elections in British Politics 1832–1914 (Boydell Press, 2013).
 (edited with Matthew Cragoe) The Land Question in Britain, 1750–1950 (Basingstoke: Palgrave Macmillan, 2010).
 "The State of Twentieth-Century British Political History", Journal of Policy History, vol. 21, no. 3 (2009), pp. 219–238.
 "Jesse Collings and Land Reform, 1886–1914", Historical Research, vol. 81, no. 212 (2008), pp. 292–314.
 "Preserving the English Landscape, c. 1870–1914", Cultural and Social History, vol. 5, no. 2 (2008), pp. 197–218.
 "Conservatives and the Politics of Land: Lord Winchilsea's National Agricultural Union, 1893–1901", The English Historical Review, vol. 121, no. 490 (2006), pp. 25–69.
 "The Place of the Past in English Culture, c. 1890–1914", Past and Present, vol. 186, no. 1 (2005), pp. 147–199.
 "The Conservative Party, Patriotism, and British Politics: The Case of the General Election of 1900", Journal of British Studies, vol. 40, no. 1 (2001), pp. 107–145.
 "Landscape Preservation, 'Advertising Disfigurement' and English National Identity, c. 1890–1914", Rural History: Economy, Society, Culture, vol. 12, no. 1 (2001), pp. 61–83.
 "The Liberal Party and Patriotism in Early Twentieth Century Britain", Twentieth Century British History, vol. 12, no. 3 (2001), pp. 269–302.
 "The 1895 General Election and Political Change in Late Victorian Britain", Historical Journal, vol. 42, no. 2 (1999), pp. 467–493.

Reviews of his published works 
Walking Histories 1800–1914
 William Whyte for The English Historical Review, vol. 132, no. 556 (2017), pp. 736–737.
 Peter Borsay for Social History, vol. 42, no. 3 (2017), pp. 439–440

Borderlands in World History, 1700–1914
 Martin Klatt for Journal of Borderlands Studies, vol. 32, no. 3 (2017), pp. 413–414.

By-elections in British Politics 1832–1914
 Ben Weinstein for Journal of British Studies, vol. 53, no. 1 (2014), pp. 254–255.
 James Owen for Parliamentary History, vol. 34, no. 2 (2014), p. 272.
 Alun Wyburn-Powell for Parliamentary Affairs, vol. 68, no. 3 (2015), pp. 641–645.

The Land Question in Britain, 1750–1950
 John Martin for The English Historical Review vol. CXXVI, no. 520 (2011), pp. 731–732.
 Frederick S. Milton for Journal of Victorian Culture, vol. 17, no. 2 (2012), pp. 247–250.
 R. W. Hoyle for Cultural and Social History, vol. 9, no. 4 (2012), pp. 613–614.
 Nigel Goose for Victorian Studies, vol. 53, no. 4 (2011), pp. 742–744.
 Nadine Vivier for Revue d'histoire moderne et contemporaine vol.63, no. 4 (2016), pp. 228–231.
 Edward Royle for History, vol. 96, no. 321 (2011), pp. 111–113.
 David Martin for Parliamentary History, vol. 30, no. 2 (2011), pp. 263–264.

References 

20th-century Irish historians
21st-century Irish historians
Alumni of Christ's College, Cambridge
Academics of King's College London
British historians
Year of birth missing (living people)
Living people